Corihuasi (possibly from Quechua quri gold, wasi house, "gold house") is a mountain in the Pariacaca or Huarochiri mountain range in the Andes of Peru, about  high. It is located in the Junín Region, Jauja Province, Canchayllo District, and in the Lima Region, Huarochiri Province, Quinti District. Corihuasi lies between the mountains Colquepucro in the north-west and Pariacaca in the south-east. It is situated on the western border of the Nor Yauyos-Cochas Landscape Reserve.

Satellite images from 1998, 2005, 2010, 2011 and 2012 show that the  Corihuasi glacier which flows to the northeast has retreated.

References

Mountains of Peru
Mountains of Junín Region
Mountains of Lima Region
Landforms of Lima Region
Glaciers of Peru